Francesco Antonio Rosetti (c. 1750 – 30 June 1792) was a classical era composer and double bass player, and was a contemporary of Haydn and Mozart. There is considerable confusion regarding his name. The occasional mention of a supposed, but non-existent, "Antonio Rosetti born 1744 in Milan", is due to an error by Ernst Ludwig Gerber in a later edition of his Tonkünstler-Lexikon having mistaken Rosetti for an Italian in the first edition of his own Lexikon, and therefore including Rosetti twice - once as an Italian, once as a German-Czech. Many sources claim that he was born Franz Anton Rösler, and changed his name to an Italianate form by 1773, but according to a 1792 article by Heinrich Phillip Bossler, who knew Rosetti personally, he was named Rosetti from his birth.

Life and career
Rosetti was born about 1750 in Litoměřice, a town in Northern Bohemia. He is believed to have received early musical training from the Jesuits in Prague. In 1773 Rosetti left his native country and found employment in the Hofkapelle of Prince Kraft Ernst of Oettingen-Wallerstein whom he served for sixteen years, becoming Kapellmeister in 1785. In July 1789 Rosetti left Wallerstein to accept the post of Kapellmeister to the Duke Friedrich Franz I of Mecklenburg-Schwerin in Ludwigslust where he died in service of the duke on 30 June 1792 at the age of 42 years. In 1777, he married Rosina Neher, with whom he had three daughters. In late 1781 he was granted leave to spend 5 months in Paris. Many of the finest ensembles in the city performed his works. Rosetti arranged for his music to be published, including a set of six symphonies published in 1782. He returned to his post, assured of recognition as an accomplished composer.

Rosetti wrote over 400 compositions, primarily instrumental music including many symphonies and concertos which were widely published. Rosetti also composed a significant number of vocal and choral works, particularly in the last few years of his life. Among these are German oratorios including Der sterbende Jesu and Jesus in Gethsemane (1790) and a German Hallelujah. The English music historian Charles Burney included Rosetti among the most popular composers of the period in his work A General History of Music. Rosetti is perhaps best known today for his horn concertos, which Mozart scholar H. C. Robbins Landon suggests (in The Mozart Companion) may have been a model for Mozart's four horn concertos. Rosetti is also known for writing a Requiem (1776) which was performed at a memorial for Mozart in December 1791.

Attributing some music to Rosetti is difficult because several other composers with similar names worked at the same time, including Franciscus Xaverius Antonius Rössler.

Works list 
Available recordings are listed.

Symphonies

Wind ensembles

Concertos

Chamber music 

Note: The recordings of D19 through D24 above are arrangements for harp.

Piano

Vocal works

Choral works

Liturgical works

References 

H.C. Robbins Landon, "The Concertos: (2) Their Musical Origin and Development," in H.C. Robbins Landon and Donald Mitchell, eds., The Mozart Companion, NY: Norton, 1956, p. 277. 
Sterling E. Murray: The Music of Antonio Rosetti. A Thematic Catalog ca. 1750 - 1792. Warren, Mich.: Harmonie Park Press, 1996. 
Sterling E. Murray. "Antonio Rosetti", Grove Music Online, ed. L. Macy (accessed February 5, 2006), grovemusic.com (subscription access)
Sterling E. Murray. The Career of an Eighteenth-Century Kapellmeister: The Life and Music of Antonio Rosetti. University of Rochester Press, 2014.

External links 
 Homepage of the Internationale Rosetti Gesellschaft
 A biography of Rosetti (in English) at Mozartforum.com
 A shorter biography (in English) at Bach-Cantatas.com
 Horn Concertos of Rosetti at Robert Ostermeyer Musikedition
 Extensive information (in German) Including complete list of works, at Klassika.info
 

1750 births
1792 deaths
18th-century classical composers
18th-century male musicians
18th-century Bohemian musicians
Czech Classical-period composers
Czech male classical composers
Czech expatriates in Germany
People from Litoměřice
String quartet composers